Genetic load is the difference between the fitness of an average genotype in a population and the fitness of some reference genotype, which may be either the best present in a population, or may be the theoretically optimal genotype. The average individual taken from a population with a low genetic load will generally, when grown in the same conditions, have more surviving offspring than the average individual from a population with a high genetic load. Genetic load can also be seen as reduced fitness at the population level compared to what the population would have if all individuals had the reference high-fitness genotype. High genetic load may put a population in danger of extinction.

Fundamentals
Consider n genotypes , which have the fitnesses  and frequencies , respectively. Ignoring frequency-dependent selection, the genetic load  may be calculated as:

where  is either some theoretical optimum, or the maximum fitness observed in the population.

One problem with calculating genetic load is that it is difficult to evaluate either the theoretically optimal genotype, or the maximally fit genotype actually present in the population. This is not a problem within mathematical models of genetic load, or for empirical studies that compare the relative value of genetic load in one setting to genetic load in another.

Causes

Deleterious mutation

Deleterious mutation load is the main contributing factor to genetic load overall. The Haldane-Muller theorem of mutation–selection balance says that the load depends only on the deleterious mutation rate and not on the selection coefficient. Specifically, relative to an ideal genotype of fitness 1, the mean population fitness is  where U is the total deleterious mutation rate summed over many independent sites. The intuition for the lack of dependence on the selection coefficient is that while a mutation with stronger effects does more harm per generation, its harm is felt for fewer generations.

A slightly deleterious mutation may not stay in mutation–selection balance but may instead become fixed by genetic drift when its selection coefficient is less than one divided by the effective population size. In asexual populations, the stochastic accumulation of mutation load is called Muller's ratchet, and occurs in the absence of beneficial mutations, when after the most-fit genotype has been lost, it cannot be regained by genetic recombination. Deterministic accumulation of mutation load occurs in asexuals when the deleterious mutation rate exceeds one per replication. Sexually reproducing species are expected to have lower genetic loads. This is one hypothesis for the evolutionary advantage of sexual reproduction. Purging of deleterious mutations in sexual populations is facilitated by synergistic epistasis among deleterious mutations.

High load can lead to a small population size, which in turn increases the accumulation of mutation load, culminating in extinction via mutational meltdown.

The accumulation of deleterious mutations in humans has been of concern to many geneticists, including Hermann Joseph Muller, James F. Crow, Alexey Kondrashov, W. D. Hamilton, and Michael Lynch.

Beneficial mutation

In sufficiently genetically loaded populations, new beneficial mutations create fitter genotypes than those previously present in the population. When load is calculated as the difference between the fittest genotype present and the average, this creates a substitutional load. The difference between the theoretical maximum (which may not actually be present) and the average is known as the "lag load". Motoo Kimura's original argument for the neutral theory of molecular evolution was that if most differences between species were adaptive, this would exceed the speed limit to adaptation set by the substitutional load. However, Kimura's argument confused the lag load with the substitutional load, using the former when it is the latter that in fact sets the maximal rate of evolution by natural selection.

More recent "travelling wave" models of rapid adaptation derive a term called the "lead" that is equivalent to the substitutional load, and find that it is a critical determinant of the rate of adaptive evolution.

Inbreeding
Inbreeding increases homozygosity. In the short run, an increase in inbreeding increases the probability with which offspring get two copies of a recessive deleterious alleles, lowering fitnesses via inbreeding depression. In a species that habitually inbreeds, e.g. through self-fertilization, a proportion of recessive deleterious alleles can be purged.

Likewise, in a small population of humans practicing endogamy, deleterious alleles can either overwhelm the population's gene pool, causing it to become extinct, or alternately, make it fitter.

Recombination/segregation
Combinations of alleles that have evolved to work well together may not work when recombined with a different suite of coevolved alleles, leading to outbreeding depression. Segregation load occurs in the presence of overdominance, i.e. when heterozygotes are more fit than either homozygote. In such a case, the heterozygous genotype gets broken down by Mendelian segregation, resulting in the production of homozygous offspring. Therefore, there is segregation load as not all individuals have the theoretical optimum genotype. Recombination load arises through unfavorable combinations across multiple loci that appear when favorable linkage disequilibria are broken down. Recombination load can also arise by combining deleterious alleles subject to synergistic epistasis, i.e. whose damage in combination is greater than that predicted from considering them in isolation.

Migration

Migration load is the result of nonnative organisms that aren’t adapted to a particular environment coming into that environment. If they breed with individuals who are adapted to that environment, their offspring will not be as fit as they would have been if both of their parents had been adapted to that particular environment. Migration load can also occur in asexually reproducing species, but in this case, purging of low fitness genotypes is more straightforward.

References

Evolutionary biology concepts
Genetics concepts
Population genetics